This Is My Street is a 1963 British black and white kitchen sink drama film directed by Sidney Hayers and starring Ian Hendry, June Ritchie, Avice Landone, John Hurt and Meredith Edwards. The screenplay is by Bill MacIlwraith from a novel by Nan Maynard. It concerns a bored housewife living in a run-down inner city London house who begins an affair with her mother's lodger, who lives next door.

Plot
On Jubilee Place, a working class area of terraced housing  in Battersea, housewife Marge Graham (June Ritchie) lives a life of drudgery with her unambitious husband Sid (Mike Pratt) and her small daughter, Cindy.

Lodging next door with Marge's mother Lily is Harry (Ian Hendry), a flashy salesman and nightclub owner who repeatedly attempts to seduce her. In the next house love Kitty and Steve, with their good-time girl daughter Maureen. Maureen works in a cafe with young Charlie (John Hurt), and is having an affair with a rich dentist, Mark. Marge works in a department store selling handbags where manager, Mr Fingus (Derek Francis), makes continual advances on her.

One day Cindy goes missing and Harry helps with the search. Finding Cindy in a scrapyard, Marge realises Harry is much more paternal than Sid and she agrees to go for a drink and has a nice afternoon. Meanwhile, Maureen sets her eyes on another rich man, Mr Ransom, while out in a club with Mark.

Marge begins an affair with Harry and they meet regularly at a mews owned by Joe. After an argument at Harry's club, Maureen and Mark are caught in a car crash: Mark is killed and Maureen badly injured, scarring her face. She accepts the offer of a date with Charlie, whose offers had previously received short shrift.

Harry eventually tires of Marge when he meets her younger, educated sister Jinny (Annette Andre), who has returned from college. It is clear that he is a man for whom the chase is more interesting than the catch, in this case even more so because Jinny has a boyfriend, hospital doctor Paul (Tom Adams); the two men, with their differing class backgrounds, show mutual resentment of each other, with Paul denigrating Harry as a barrow boy. Marge is still infatuated with Harry and jealous of Jinny, and suggests eloping and leaving Cindy behind.  When she discovers Harry plans to marry her sister she attempts to kill herself by putting her head in the gas oven. She is saved by a shower which leads her mother to bring in the washing, close enough to the house that she smells the gas. She has left a suicide note exposing her affair with Harry, but her mother's chance intervention means an ambulance rushes her to hospital. Lily evicts Harry, and Jinny breaks it off with him. Lily suggests to Sid that he finds another job in ‘a nice clean area”.

Marge recovers and Jinny marries Paul. Harry is left alone, with the final scene showing Marge rejecting his renewed advances before going home to her old street and what appears to be a happier household.

Cast

Critical reception
The Radio Times called it "a well-written, nicely shot squalor fest"; Allmovie called it an "unsavory British programmer"; Britmovie noted a "Sixties’ backstreets bedroom drama adapted from Nan Maynard's rather middling novel. Director Sidney Hayers fashions an interesting drama amid the sordid squalor of London and creates a number of genuinely sympathetic characters. Ian Hendry giving a performance of compelling magnetic brilliance as the jack-the-lad charmer capable of turning from seducer to scoundrel and back again in the blink of an eye"; and TV Guide wrote, "The even direction smooths over the ugly plot of a mean little womanizer...Hendry and Ritchie exude interesting chemistry together, and the movie spins right along while they are on the screen." Halliwell describes it pithily as an “unremarkable low-life drama”.

References

External links

1964 films
1964 drama films
Adultery in films
British black-and-white films
British drama films
Films based on British novels
Films directed by Sidney Hayers
Films produced by Peter Rogers
Films set in London
Films shot in London
Films shot at Pinewood Studios
Social realism in film
1960s English-language films
1960s British films